"In Your Care" is the second single released from English singer-songwriter Tasmin Archer's debut album, Great Expectations (1992). It was released on 8 February 1993 but failed to pick up as much airplay and media support as "Sleeping Satellite", stalling at number 16 on the UK Singles Chart. The song also charted in New Zealand at number 36 but stayed in the top 50 for only one week. The money made from this release was donated to the charity Child Line.

Song information
The lyrics of "In Your Care" deal with the topic of child abuse. CD1 and CD2 of the song were released on two separate weeks. CD1 includes a remix of album track "Ripped Inside" while CD2 and the 7-inch vinyl release include a remix of "Sleeping Satellite".

Critical reception
In his review of Great Expectations, Roch Parisien from AllMusic viewed the song a "more solid" contender, describing it as "sombre-yet-vibrant". Alan Jones from Music Week named it Pick of the Week, writing, "This arresting and powerful ballad has quality written all over it, and should impress radio despite the "Sonofabitch, you broke my heart" line." He concluded, "Another monster, and one which will underline Archer's status as one of the UK's most promising talents." Nancy Culp from NME named it "one of the album's best tracks", noting that it "explores the thorny subject of child abuse in such a from-the-heart manner that the pain and confusion simply leap out and hit you in the tear ducts."

Track listings
 7-inch single
A. "In Your Care" – 4:22
B. "Sleeping Satellite" (Fitz mix) – 6:15

 UK CD1
 "In Your Care"
 "Sea of Rest"
 "Ripped Inside" (Ben Chapman mix)

 UK CD2
 "In Your Care"
 "Sleeping Satellite" (Fitz mix)
 "Real Oh So Real"

Charts

References

1992 songs
1993 singles
Song recordings produced by Julian Mendelsohn
Songs about child abuse
Songs written by John Beck (songwriter)
Songs written by Tasmin Archer
Tasmin Archer songs
Virgin Records singles